Camilo Cervino (21 March 1928 – 15 November 2017) was an Argentine footballer. He played in one match for the Argentina national football team in 1947. He was also part of Argentina's squad for the 1947 South American Championship.

References

External links
 
 

1928 births
2017 deaths
Argentine footballers
Argentina international footballers
Place of birth missing
Association football forwards
Club Atlético Independiente footballers
Deportivo Cali footballers
América de Cali footballers
Argentine expatriate footballers
Expatriate footballers in Colombia
Argentine football managers
Argentine expatriate football managers
Expatriate football managers in Colombia
América de Cali managers